The 1974 Virginia Slims of Chicago  was a women's tennis tournament played on indoor carpet courts at the Lake Shore Racquet Club in Chicago, Illinois in the United States that was part of the 1974 Virginia Slims World Championship Series. It was the third edition of the tournament and was held from February 25 through March 3, 1974. Fourth-seeded Virginia Wade won the singles title and earned $10,000 first-prize money.

Finals

Singles
 Virginia Wade defeated  Rosie Casals 2–6, 6–4, 6–4

Doubles
 Chris Evert /  Billie Jean King defeated  Françoise Dürr /  Betty Stöve 3–6, 6–4, 6–4

Prize money

References

External links
 Women's Tennis Association (WTA) tournament details

Virginia Slims of Chicago
Virginia Slims of Chicago
Carpet court tennis tournaments
Virginia Slims of Chicago
Virginia Slims of Chicago